David Adams and Andrei Olhovskiy were the defending champions, but lost in the first round to Yevgeny Kafelnikov and Menno Oosting.

Martin Damm and Brett Steven won the title by defeating David Prinosil and Udo Riglewski 6–3, 6–4 in the final.

Seeds

Draw

Draw

References

External links
 Official results archive (ATP)
 Official results archive (ITF)

1994 Copenhagen Open – 2
1994 ATP Tour